The 1991–92 Azadegan League was the first season of the Azadegan League that was won by PAS Tehran.

 Azadegan League champions: Pas Tehran

 Relegated: Sepahan, Esteghlal Rasht
 Promoted: Keshavarz, Sanat Naft, Vahdat Sari,  Bargh Shiraz, Polyacryl, Sepidrood Rasht

Top goal scorer

Farshad Pious (Piroozi) (11 goals)

References 

Azadegan League seasons
Iran
1991–92 in Iranian football